Anton Profes (1896–1976) was an Austrian composer.

Selected filmography
 Josef the Chaste (1930)
 Suburban Cabaret (1935)
 The Eternal Mask (1935)
 Hannerl and Her Lovers (1936)
 The Postman from Longjumeau (1936)
 The Empress's Favourite  (1936)
 Talking About Jacqueline (1937)
 Linen from Ireland (1939)
 The Eternal Spring (1940)
 Everything for Gloria (1941)
 Destiny (1942)
 The White Dream (1943)
 The Queen of the Landstrasse (1948)
 Maresi (1948)
 Vagabonds (1949)
 Your Heart Is My Homeland (1953)
 Grandstand for General Staff (1953)
 Victoria in Dover (1954)
 The Red Prince (1954)
 I Know What I'm Living For (1955)
 Sissi (1955)
 Sissi – The Young Empress (1956)
 Sissi – Fateful Years of an Empress (1957)
 Gustav Adolf's Page (1960)

References

Bibliography
 Robert von Dassanowsky. Austrian Cinema: A History. McFarland, 2005.

External links

1896 births
1976 deaths
Austrian male composers
People from Litoměřice
Austrian people of German Bohemian descent
20th-century male musicians